SPG can refer to:

Places
 Albert Whitted Airport (IATA: SPG), in St. Petersburg, Florida
 Springfield Union Station (Massachusetts), Amtrak station code SPG

Arts, entertainment, and media

Music
 Slumber Party Girls, an all-girl American pop band
 SPG Records
 Steam Powered Giraffe, a steampunk musical project

Other arts, entertainment, and media
Shortest proof game, a type of chess problem
 Special Patrol Group, a hamster in UK TV series The Young Ones
 Strong Parental Guidance, Philippine Movie and Television Review and Classification Board rating
 The Super Parental Guardians, a Philippine film

Healthcare
 Spastic gait gene, causing hereditary spastic paraplegia

Organizations and enterprises
 Simon Property Group, US, NYSE symbol
 Society for the Propagation of the Gospel in Foreign Parts, Church of England, 1701-1964
 Special Patrol Group (RUC) of the Royal Ulster Constabulary 
 Special Patrol Group of the Metropolitan Police
 Special Protection Group, for the Prime Minister of India
 Starwood Preferred Guest, a defunct loyalty program
 State Protection Group, of New South Wales police

Slang
 Sarong Party Girl, a Singaporean insult

Technology
 Self-propelled gun, one type of Self-propelled artillery
 Submersible pressure gauge in scuba diving
 Sync pulse generator, a type of video signal generator

Other uses
 A Saab 900 car option
 Steals, a basketball statistic